List of schools in Ottawa, Ontario, Canada.

Colleges and universities

Public colleges and universities 
Algonquin College
Carleton University
Dominican University College
La Cité collégiale
University of Ottawa
Saint Paul University

Private 
 Augustine College (unaccredited)

Elementary and secondary public schools in Ottawa

Public school boards

English 
 List of schools of the Ottawa-Carleton District School Board

French 
 List of schools of the Conseil des écoles publiques de l'Est de l'Ontario

Catholic school boards

English
 List of schools of the Ottawa Catholic School Board

French
 List of schools of the Conseil des écoles catholiques de langue française du Centre-Est

Elementary and secondary private schools in Ottawa

English 
Ashbury College
Astolot Educational Centre
Blyth Academy
Edelweiss Private Academy
The Element High School 
Elmwood School
Fern Hill School
Glebe Montessori School
Heritage Academy
Kanata Academy
Kanata Montessori School
Manotick Montessori School
March Academy
MindWare Academy
Revel Academy
Turnbull School
VINCI School
Polaris School and Centre

Bilingual 
Académie St-Laurent Academy
Académie Joan of Arc Academy
Macdonald-Cartier Academy
OMS Montessori
Westboro Academy

French 

Académie de la Capitale 
Lycée Claudel d'Ottawa

Jewish 

Ottawa Jewish Community School
Ottawa Torah Institute
Torah Day School of Ottawa
Westboro Jewish Montessori

Christian 

Académie Providence
Ambassadors Christian School
Bishop Hamilton Montessori School
Community Christian School
Maryvale Academy
Ottawa Christian School
Ottawa Victory Christian Academy
Redeemer Christian High School
St. Timothy's Classical Academy

Islamic 

Abraar School
Ottawa Islamic School
Ahlul-Bayt Islamic School
Ecole Ibn Batouta

Bibliography

 Ottawa